Campora is a town and comune in the province of Salerno, Italy.

Campora may  also refer to:

Campora San Giovanni, province of Cosenza, Italy
La Cámpora, Argentine youth wing of the "Front for Victory" party

People with the surname
Anne-Marie Campora (1938-2015), Monegasque politician
Charles Campora, Monegasque businessman
Jean-Louis Campora (born 1938), Monegasque physician, politician and businessman
Giuseppe Campora (1923–2004), Italian operatic tenor
Héctor José Cámpora (1909–1980), President of Argentina
Monina Cámpora (1914–1998), Dominican Republic pianist and educator